The Honda Dio is a scooter manufactured by Honda and was introduced in 1988. It was originally built in Japan, as a 2-stroke model until 2001. It is now assembled by Sundiro Honda Motorcycle Co., Ltd. in China.

It is composed of four-stroke lines: the AF-series 50 cc (3.1 cu in) (SK50) and the JF-series 110 cc (6.7 cu in) (NSC110) are now assembled in China.

Model history and specifications

The original Dio was equipped with the two-stroke  AF18E single-cylinder engine with electric start. It is superficially similar to the US-market Honda "Elite S”. The Honda Dio was sold in 17 different models, and used the model code “AF” with numbers from 18 to 35 e.g.: AF28, it also has huge aftermarket support therefore, has been widely known in the Asian scooter scene. The model has a  fuel tank with no reserve.

In 2011, Honda introducing a 110 cc (NSC110) version of the long-awaited Dio in Japan. It is also manufactured in China. It is also available in Australia and New Zealand.

Indian model

The Honda Dio is an Indian scooter manufactured by Honda Motorcycle and Scooter India. It is being built at the plant in Narsapura, Karnataka. It was introduced in 2001 and has crossed 30 lakh sales milestone in 2019. Aside from the domestic market, the Dio is exported to Nepal, Bangladesh, Sri Lanka, and Latin America. A rebadged version is sold as the Honda Lead in the European market.

Original model was launched in 2001, model name SCV100, was equipped with a  air-cooled, four-stroke, 8V (8 valve), OHC engine with both electric self-start and kick start.  This version has a  fuel tank, of which one litre is reserve. 

In 2012, HMSI launched a new Dio, SCV110, at Auto Expo in India. It has a new  engine, which also runs Honda's Activa and Aviator. It also has a new look and new headlight.

The 2013 Dio had claimed improvements in fuel efficiency and combined brakes.

In 2017, Honda launched the revamped version of the Dio, complying with Bharat Standard – IV (BS-IV) Emission regulations, featuring a redesigned speedometer design, along with the inclusion of an LED headlight. Later in 2018, Honda launched the Dio Deluxe, featuring digital speedometer and power seats, while retaining the look of the 2017 model.

In 2020, Honda launched an all-new revamped version of the Dio, complying with Bharat Standard – VI (BS-VI) Emission regulations and with the addition of programmed fuel-injection system. Telescopic shock absorbers were introduced in this model.  The top-of-the-line Dio Deluxe (introduced in 2018) has been retained with redesigned full digital speedometer and power seats. A Repsol Edition based on the Dio Deluxe was introduced in November 2020.

Trims

STD
The Standard (STD) is a base model of the Dio. It features an analogue instrument panel with a speedometer. It features a halogen headlights, making a much look appearance. An LED (light-emitting diode) option is now standard in 2017 for the BS-IV Dio.

DLX
The Deluxe (DX or DLX) is a premium, top-of-the-line model of the Dio. It features a first-segment fully digital instrument panel, as well as projector headlights, and an optional power seats.

Repsol Edition
The Repsol Edition is a special-themed, variant of the BS-VI Dio Deluxe, commemorating Repsol Honda's 800 victories of MotoGP. Unique features include a tri-color theme (consist of Red, White, and Orange), as well as a Repsol Honda specific alloy rims which replaced the steel rims found in both existing models.

Awards

 Scooter of the year 2003 (BBC)

Gallery

References

External links

Official website

Dio
Indian motor scooters
Motorcycles introduced in 1988
Motorcycles introduced in 2002